Roy Livingstone Plummer (born c. 1948), better known as King Sounds, is a Jamaican reggae musician who released several albums from late 1970s onwards.

Biography
Born Roy Livingstone Plummer, c.1948 in Saint Elizabeth Parish, Jamaica, King Sounds emigrated to the UK in 1964, having already made some recordings in Jamaica. Known simply as 'Sounds', he acted as an MC for reggae shows, and impressed Alton Ellis so much that Ellis gave him the name 'King Sounds'. His debut single was "Rock and Roll Lullaby", released in 1975. He formed the Grove Music collective in Ladbroke Grove with Mikey Campbell. He performed regularly with artists such as Aswad and at the Notting Hill Carnival, his band the Israelites featuring Clifton "Bigga" Morrison, Eddie "Tan Tan" Thornton, and Michael "Bammi" Rose. After two albums on Grove Music and his own KSI label, he was signed by Island Records for the 1981 album Forward. He released further albums into the 1990s on his own King & I label.

Discography
Come Zion Side Happiness (1979), Grove Music
Moving Forward (1980), KSI – with the Israelites
Forward (1981), Island – with the Israelites
There Is a Reward (1985), King Sounds – with the Israelites
Strength to Strength (1988), King & I
I Shall Sing (1992), King & I
"I Don't Want to Hurt You", single

References

External links

Jamaican reggae singers
Living people
People from Saint Elizabeth Parish
Year of birth missing (living people)